This page details football records in Indonesia.

National team

Individual
Most appearances: 111, Abdul Kadir (1965 - 1979) (105 in official FIFA matches)
Most goals: 70, Abdul Kadir (1965 - 1979) (68 in official FIFA matches)
Best scoring percentage (players with 20+ goals): 63% (70 goals in 111 games), Abdul Kadir (1965 - 1979)

Scorelines
Biggest win: 12 goals margin
 12 - 0 ( v. Philippines, 22 September 1972)
 13 - 1 ( v. Philippines, 23 December 2002)
Biggest home win: 13 - 1, v. Philippines (23 December 2002)
Biggest away win: 8 - 0, v. New Zealand (4 October 1975)
Biggest win in neutral ground: 12 - 0, v. Philippines (Seoul, 22 September 1972)
Biggest defeat: 0 - 10, v. Bahrain (29 February 2012)
Biggest home defeat: 1 - 7, v. Uruguay (8 October 2010)
Biggest away defeat: 0 - 10, v. Bahrain (29 February 2012)
Biggest defeat in neutral ground: 0 - 6, v. Hungary (Reims, 5 June 1938)
Highest scoring: 14 goals, Indonesia 13 - 1 Philippines (23 December 2002)

Top-Tier Professional League
Records in this section refer to Liga Indonesia Premier Division from its founding in 1994 until 2007 (when it was still the top-tier league), to the Indonesia Super League from 2008 to the present, and to the Indonesian Premier League during the dualism era.

Titles
Most League titles: 4, Persipura Jayapura (2005, 2008–09, 2010–11, 2013)

Top-flight Appearances
Most appearances: 26 seasons, Persib Bandung, Persija Jakarta
Most consecutive seasons in top-flight: 26 seasons, Persib Bandung, Persija Jakarta  (1994 to 2022/23)

Individual
Most career goals: 344, Cristian Gonzáles (2003 to 2018)
Most goals in a season: 37, Sylvano Comvalius Dominique (2017)
Most top goalscorer awards: 4, Cristian Gonzáles (2005, 2006, 2007-08, 2008-09)
Most goals in a game: 6, Ilham Jayakesuma (Persita Tangerang 10 - 1 Persikab, 28 April 2002)
Most hat-tricks: 11, Cristian Gonzáles (2003 to 2010-11)

Scorelines
Biggest home win: Persita Tangerang 10-1 Persikab Bandung (28 April 2002)
Highest scoring: 12 goals
 Pelita Jaya 10-2 Persijatim Jakarta Timur (14 June 1995)
 Sriwijaya 10-2 Persegres Gresik United (5 November 2017)

Indonesia Super League – since 2008-09 season

Titles
Most titles: 3, Persipura Jayapura (2008–09, 2010–11, 2013)

Top-flight appearances
Most seasons in top flight overall: 13 seasons, Arema, Madura United, Persib Bandung, Persija Jakarta
Most consecutive seasons in top flight: 13 seasons, Arema, Madura United, Persib Bandung, Persija Jakarta
Fewest seasons in top flight overall: 1 season, Kalteng Putra, Persema Malang, Persiba Bantul, PSAP Sigli

Wins
Most wins  overall: 165, Persipura Jayapura
Most wins in a season: 25
 Persipura Jayapura (2008–09, 2013)
 Sriwijaya (2011–12)
Fewest wins in a season: 2
 Persijap Jepara (2014)
 Persiba Bantul (2014)
 Persegres Gresik United (2017)
 Persiraja Banda Aceh (2021–22)
Most consecutive wins: 9, Persipura Jayapura   (15 March 2009 – 20 May 2009)
Most consecutive home wins: 15, Arema   (27 January 2010 – 27 March 2011)

Draws
Most draws in a season: 15, Borneo (2019)
Fewest draws in a season: 2
Deltras (2010–11)
Persijap Jepara (2014)
Bhayangkara (2017)

Losses
Most losses in a season: 28: Persegres Gresik United (2017)
Fewest losses in a season: 2, Persipura Jayapura (2010–11, 2013)
Longest unbeaten run: 37 games, Persipura Jayapura (13 December 2009 - 6 February 2011)
Most consecutive losses: 12, PSPS Riau (2013)
Most consecutive away losses: 21, PSPS Riau (9 March 2013 - 18 September 2013)

Individual
Most Indonesia Super League goals: 67, Boaz Solossa (2008-09 to 2010-11)
Most goals in a season (34 games): 37, Sylvano Dominique Comvalius (Bali United, 2017)
Most top goalscorer awards: 3, Boaz Solossa (2008-09, 2010-11, 2013)
Most goals in a game: 5
 Ilija Spasojević (Mitra Kukar 8 - 2 PSPS, 15 September 2013)
 Sylvano Dominique Comvalius (Bali United 6 - 1 Mitra Kukar, 27 August 2017)
Most Indonesia Super League hat-tricks: 4, Boaz Solossa (2008-09 to 2010-11)

Team
Most points in a season (34 games): 80, Persipura Jayapura (2008–09)
Fewest points in a season (34 games): 10, Persegres Gresik United (2017)
Fewest points in a season (28 games): 15, Bontang (2010-11)
Most goals scored in a season: 81, Persipura Jayapura (2008–09)
Fewest goals scored in a season: 17, PSIS Semarang (2008–09)
Most goals conceded in a season: 104, Persegres Gresik United (2017)
Fewest goals conceded in a season (34 games): 22, Arema (2009-10)
Best goal difference in a season: +56, Persipura Jayapura (2008–09)
Worst goal difference in a season (34 games): −78, Persegres Gresik United (2017)
Worst goal difference in a season (28 games): −46, Bontang (2010-11)
Most clean sheets in a season (34 games): 18, Persiwa Wamena (2008–09)
Fewest clean sheets in a season (34 games): 0, Persegres Gresik United (2017)
Fewest clean sheets in a season (28 games): 1, Bontang (2010-11)
Longest consecutive clean sheets: 6 games, Persiwa Wamena (28 March 2009 - 20 May 2009)

Scorelines
Biggest home win: 
 Sriwijaya 10-2 Persegres Gresik United (5 November 2017) 
 Persela Lamongan 9-1 PSPS Pekanbaru (12 June 2013)
 Arema 8-0 Bontang (19 June 2010)
 Madura United 8-0 Barito Putera (23 July 2022)
Biggest away win: Persijap Jepara 0-8 Arema Cronus (5 September 2014)
Highest scoring: 12 Goals, Sriwijaya 10-2 Persegres Gresik United (5 November 2017)

Piala Indonesia (Indonesia's Cup)

Final

Team
Most wins: 3, Sriwijaya (2007, 2009, 2010)
Most consecutive wins: 3, Sriwijaya (2007, 2009, 2010)
Most appearances: 3
Sriwijaya (2007, 2009, 2010)
Arema (2005, 2006, 2010)
Persipura Jayapura (2006, 2007, 2009)
Most defeats in final: 3, Persipura Jayapura (2006, 2007, 2009)

All rounds

Scorelines
Biggest home win:
 Persegi Gianyar 9-0 Persipro Probolinggo (2 June 2005)
 PSM Makassar 9-0 Perseru Serui (16 February 2019)
Biggest away win: PSBI Blitar 0-14 Persebaya Surabaya (2 September 2018)
Highest scoring: 14 goals, PSBI Blitar 0-14 Persebaya Surabaya (2 September 2018)

Individual
Most goals in a season: 11, Javier Roca (2005)
Most goals in a game: 5
Fodé Camara (Bontang 8 - 0 Barito Putera, 15 May 2005)
Javier Roca (Persegi Gianyar 9 - 0 Persipro Probolinggo, 2 June 2005)
Cristian Gonzáles (Persik Kediri 7 - 0 Persikabo Bogor, 8 September 2005)
Marko Šimić (Persija Jakarta 8 - 2 757 Kepri Jaya, 23 January 2019)
Most hat-tricks in Piala Indonesia: 4, Cristian Gonzáles (2005 - 2010)

Managers
Most titles wins: 5, Rahmad Darmawan (Persipura Jayapura - 1 title, Sriwijaya - 4 titles)
Most top-flight League title wins: 4, Jacksen Ferreira Tiago, (Persebaya Surabaya - 2004, Persipura Jayapura - 2008-09, 2010-11, 2013)
Most Piala Indonesia wins: 3, Rahmad Darmawan (Sriwijaya - 2007, 2009, 2010)

See also
 Indonesian football league system
 Indonesia Super League
 Liga Indonesia Premier Division
 Piala Indonesia
 List of Indonesian football champions

Notes

References

External links
 Official website of Liga Indonesia
 Official website of Liga Indonesia Baru
 Official website of PSSI

Records
Indonesia